Capitaine Raymond Dronne (8 March 1908, in Mayet, France – 5 September 1991, in Paris) was a French civil servant and, following World War II, a politician.  He was the second Allied officer to enter Paris as part of the liberation forces during World War II. A volunteer who joined the Free French Forces in Africa in 1940. Later, he was assigned as commanding officer of the 9e Compagnie, Régiment de Marche du Tchad (Ninth Company, Regiment of March of Chad), known as "La Nueve" as it was mainly composed of Spanish republicans. The 9th Company was a unit of the 3rd battalion RMT, part of the French 2nd Armored Division.

During the move on Paris, due to combat conditions and poor road progress, General Philippe Leclerc, commanding general of the Second Armored, ordered Dronne to form an advance party, go to Paris and let the Resistance know that the Second Armored would be in Paris in 24 hours.

His advance party, the 9th Company, consisted of 15 half tracks (M5s and M5A1s), and three Sherman tanks from 501 RCC of the division, plus engineer units.  The H/Ts included those called Les Cossaques, Guadalajara, Madrid and Ebro and the added Sherman tanks were called Montmirail, Romilly and Champaubert. 

1908 births
1991 deaths
People from Sarthe
Politicians from Pays de la Loire
Rally of the French People politicians
National Centre of Social Republicans politicians
Union for the New Republic politicians
Reformist Movement (France) politicians
French Senators of the Fourth Republic
Senators of Sarthe
Deputies of the 2nd National Assembly of the French Fourth Republic
Deputies of the 3rd National Assembly of the French Fourth Republic
Deputies of the 1st National Assembly of the French Fifth Republic
Deputies of the 4th National Assembly of the French Fifth Republic
Deputies of the 5th National Assembly of the French Fifth Republic
Free French military personnel of World War II